The 2022–23 Wisconsin Badgers women's basketball represents the University of Wisconsin at Madison in the 2022–23 college basketball season. Led by second year head coach Marisa Moseley, the team plays their games at Kohl Center and are members of the Big Ten Conference.

Schedule and results

|-
!colspan=12 style=|Exhibition

|-
!colspan=12 style=|Regular season

|-
!colspan="6" style=| Big Ten Women's Tournament

See also
 2022–23 Wisconsin Badgers men's basketball team

References

Wisconsin Badgers women's basketball seasons
Wisconsin Badgers
Wisconsin Badgers women's basketball
Wisconsin Badgers women's basketball